Onangudi  is a village in the  
Arimalam revenue block of Pudukkottai district 
, Tamil Nadu, India.

References

Villages in Pudukkottai district